Constant Hot Water is a 1923 British silent comedy film directed by George A. Cooper and starring Gladys Jennings, John Stuart and Lawford Davidson.

Cast
 Gladys Jennings as Rosina Tennant  
 John Stuart as Cuthbert  
 Lawford Davidson as Man  
 Nora Roylance as Girl  
 Gibb McLaughlin as Eardley Adams  
 John Marlborough East as Janitor

References

Bibliography
 Murphy, Robert. Directors in British and Irish Cinema: A Reference Companion. British Film Institute, 2006.

External links

1923 films
1923 comedy films
British silent short films
British comedy films
Films directed by George A. Cooper
British black-and-white films
1920s English-language films
1920s British films
Silent comedy films